Ihor Hryhorovych Nichenko (18 April 1971) is a Ukrainian football coach and former player who played as a forward.

Playing career 

Nichenko was born on 18 April 1971 in  Kherson. He studied at the Kherson Children-Youth Sport school  1 with instructor Vasyl Kravchenko. Nichenko started his career in the early 1990s in Khmelnytsky at its team in the 1989 Soviet Second League. Next year he was drafted to the top league's Metalist Kharkiv where he could not find his touch. In 1992, he returned to his hometown Kherson, joining Krystal. After an impressive start at the club in the Ukrainian First League, Nichenko was signed by the Kryvbas club at the end of 1992. In Kryvbas he set a record for the goals scored in a game and the goals scored in a season (12), finishing third amongst the best scorers. At the top level of Soviet and Ukrainian competitions, he played over 100 matches with 87 in the Ukrainian Premier League.

Since 1995 and for the next 10 years, Nichenko played in various Hungarian clubs such as Ferencvaros, Dunaferr, and others. There he became the two-time champion with those teams. He was also the top scorer of the Hungarian championship in 1996–97 for Ferencvaros, scoring 18 goals, and becoming the first foreign player ever to score the most goals in a season in Hungary. He played more than 250 games in Hungary scoring almost 100 goals. Since 2005, he has been signed with Ukrainian clubs, but has not played any games officially.

Coaching career 
Upon retiring, Nichenko stayed in FC Krystal Kherson working together with Yuriy Martynov as the head coach. In 2007, he joined the local amateur club, Sigma Kherson, as a staff coach and since 2008 has been its head coach.

References

Sources 
 Реєстр матчів гравця на офіційному сайті ФФУ
 Прoфиль на сайте "Футболфан" 
 Статистика на сайті КЛИСФ 
 Ігор Ніченко хоче грати на Батьківщині 
 Український легіонер Ігор Ніченко завершив виступи в елітних клубах Угорщини
 Херсонська "Сигма" – чемпіон області-2008
 "Кривбас" для вас

External links 
 

1971 births
Living people
Sportspeople from Kherson
Ukrainian footballers
Soviet footballers
Association football forwards
Ferencvárosi TC footballers
Dunaújváros FC players
Győri ETO FC players
FC Kryvbas Kryvyi Rih players
FC Krystal Kherson players
FC Metalist Kharkiv players
FC Podillya Khmelnytskyi players
Ukrainian Premier League players
FC Hoverla Uzhhorod players
Ukrainian football managers
Ukrainian expatriate footballers
Ukrainian expatriate football managers
Ukrainian expatriate sportspeople in Hungary
Expatriate footballers in Hungary
Expatriate football managers in Hungary